Jürgen Kampel (born January 28, 1981) is a retired Austrian football midfielder.

Honours
 Austrian Cup winner: 2000-01
 Austrian Football First League winner: 2000-01

External links
 

1981 births
Living people
Austrian footballers
SC Austria Lustenau players
FC Kärnten players
Sportspeople from Klagenfurt
Footballers from Carinthia (state)
Association football midfielders